Yana Qaqa (Quechua yana black, qaqa rock, "black rock", also spelled Yana Khakha) is a  mountain in the Andes of Bolivia. It is located in the Potosí Department, Nor Chichas Province, Cotagaita Municipality. Yana Qaqa lies at the Caiti River.

References 

Mountains of Potosí Department